Mit Karl May im Orient (English: With Karl May in the Orient) is the title of a six-part television series based on the Orient cycle of adventure novels by Karl May.

Background
The show was originally broadcast in 1963 by the German broadcaster ZDF. In the series the themes of the Orient Cycle, which includes Durch die Wüste, Durchs wilde Kurdistan, Von Bagdad nach Stambul, In den Schluchten des Balkan, Durch das Land der Skipetaren, and Der Schut, are discussed.

Series parts
The six parts of the series included:
 "Kara Ben Nemsi"
 "Tod im Sumpf"
 "Die Rose von Kbili"
 "Die tote Stadt"
 "Das Geheimnis des Bettlers"
 "Der falsche Hakim"

References 

Television shows based on works by Karl May
1963 German television series debuts
1963 German television series endings
Television series set in the 19th century
Television shows based on German novels
German-language television shows
ZDF original programming